Ardit Gjebrea (born 7 June 1963) is an Albanian singer-songwriter, producer, and television presenter.

Life and career 
Gjebrea began singing at the age of five in Albanian children festivals, and is known for songs like "I ëmbël zëri i gjyshës", "Kur kendoj per ty moj nënë" and "Ballë për pionierin dëshmor". On 17 December 1991, he made a breakthrough in his career, winning the Festivali i Këngës në RTSH prize with the song "Jon". In 1995, he won the same prize with his song "Eja".

Ardit Gjebrea has released three albums throughout his career, beginning with the eponymous "Ardit Gjebrea" in 1992. In 1997 he launched "Projekt Jon", the best-selling album in Albania. "Projekt Jon" showcased Gjebrea's artistic range as he merged influences of Albanian traditional music, Balkanic and Mediterranean sounds and instruments as well as recent trends in international music. In 2004 he released "Ja ku jam", an album mostly covered in Gjebrea's musical translations of inner wandering, sentimental and melancholic moods, and rock&pop hits.

As a singer-songwriter he has held some 250 concerts in Albania, as well as performances in USA, Canada, Germany, United Kingdom, Greece, Romania, Turkey, Italy, Belgium and China.

Ardit’s daughter, Anna Gjebrea, represented Albania in the Junior Eurovision Song Contest 2021.

Career as a presenter and producer 
During his career, he has presented and produced several TV shows including the famous TeleBingo, several editions of the yearly Miss & Mister Albania, Dua më shumë Shqipërinë, Rokoloko, Krishtlindje në Tiranë, etc. In 1996 he was host of the Miss Europe Contest, held that year in Albania. In 2007 Gjebrea hosted the 19th edition of the 'Miss Model of the World' contest held in China.

Kënga Magjike 
Every year, in a process starting in June and ending in November, Ardit Gjebrea, through his production house JonMusic and in cooperation with KLAN Television produces and finalizes Kënga Magjike, a festival of the contemporary music for artists from Albania, Kosovo, Macedonia and Montenegro. The first Kenga Magjike was held in 1999, and the last edition took place in November 2016. Kenga Magjike is broadcast live in Albania by Klan TV, Ora News and STV, in Kosovo by RTV21, in Macedonia by Alsat and across the Balkans by the Bulgarian network Ballkanika Music Television.

E Diela Shqiptare 

Since 2008, Ardit Gjebrea is the producer and host of E Diela Shqiptare (Albanian Sunday), a Sunday afternoon show. E Diela Shqiptare includes debates, ballet, live music, performances, guests, sport results, games, etc. E Diela Shqiptare is broadcast live on Klan TV from 13:30 – 19:30.

Albanian Telebingo – a weekly national lottery, with live in-studio draws and surprise calls to viewers offering prizes.

Ballet – Contemporary Ballet. 

The Interview – The most important and interesting individuals in Albania appear live in the studio of ‘The Albanian Sunday” in a face-to-face interview with host Ardit Gjebrea.

Shihemi në Gjyq – An [arbitration based court show|Court_show#Arbitration-based_reality_court_show], where arbitrator Eni Çobani helps citizens solve conflicts, often regarding property rights. The segment is known for its audience participation, where the audience votes on the issue, and also for the fights that often break out over small issues.

Awards and nominations

Festivali i Këngës

|-
||1991
||"Jon"
|First place
|
|-
||1995
||"Eja"
|First place
|
|-
||2000
||"Ante i tokes sime"
|First place/As Producer
|
|-
||2009
||"Nuk mundem pa ty"
|First place/As Producer and writer
|
|}

Kult Awards

|-
||2005
||"Ja ku jam"
|Album of the Year
|
|}

Videofest

|-
|rowspan="2"|2004
|rowspan="2"|"Ja ku jam"
|Best Male Video
|
|-
|The Most Popular Video
|
|}

Zhurma Show Awards

|-
|rowspan="2"|2004
|rowspan="2"|"Ja ku jam"
|Best Song
|
|-
|Best Album
|
|}

See also 
 Festivali i Këngës në RTSH
 Kënga Magjike

References

External links 
 
 
 http://www.arditgjebrea.info/

Albanian musicians
Musicians from Tirana
1963 births
Living people
Albanian Christians
Festivali i Këngës winners
Albanian pop musicians